Ambarish Bhattacharya (born 13 March 1979) is a Bengali actor and comedian. He started his career through performing at Bengali theatre and stage. He made his television debut in the 2007 playing the character Gaja in Raja & Gaja. He has acted in numerous TV soap operas and Bengali films.

Career
Ambarish forayed into Bengali television with his debut fiction comedy series Raja & Gaja. He began working in films from 2011 with minor roles. He has already worked with directors like Kaushik Ganguly, Anjan Dutt, Srijit Mukherji, Kamaleswar Mukherjee, and others. Open Tee Bioscope by Anindya Chattopadhyay, Bibaho Obhijaan by Birsa Dasgupta and Gotro by Sibaprasad Mukherji and Nandita Roy are some of works with major roles. Beside these, he has also been active in sharing screens in TV commercials.

Theatre 
Ambarish started working with theatre groups from early 2000. He was closely involved in performing theatre songs along with veteran thespian and singer Ketaki Dutta. After some time he also started acting in theater groups. He has also worked in Jatra (theatre) with the famous female impersonator Chapal Bhaduri in Shitala from 2000 to 2006. Some of his works includes Ferari Fouj (2005) under Sanglap Kolkata; Puratani Natoker Gaan (songs compilation) (2006) and Kanu Kohe Raai (2010) under Sansriti group and Nisanga Samrat (2013) under Indraranga group.

Filmography and television

Television

Filmography
 Open Tee Bioscope (2015)
 Dekh Kemon Lage (2017)
 Jio Pagla (2017)
 Shob Bhooturey (2017)
Cockpit (2017)
Manojder Adbhut Bari (2018)
 Kabir (2018) 
 Bhagshesh (2018)
 Hoyto Manush Noy (2018)
 Uma (2018)
 Samsara (2019)
 Gotro (2019)
 Shantilal O Projapoti Rohoshyo (2019)
 Baccha Shoshur (2019)
 Bibaho Obhijaan (2019)
 The Parcel (2020)
 Detective (2020)
 Brahma Janen Gopon Kommoti (2020)
 Saheber Cutlet (2020)
 Switzerland (2020)
 Lokkhi Chele (2021)
 Projapoti (2022)
 Haami 2 (2022)
 Kaberi Antardhan (2023)
 Fatafati (2023)
 Ardhangini (2023)
 Raktabeej'' (2023)

Web series

Awards

References

External links 
 

Bengali actors
21st-century Indian actors
Living people
1979 births
Bengali male television actors
Male actors in Bengali cinema